Trachypepla cyphonias is a species of moth in the family Oecophoridae. It is endemic to New Zealand and has been collected in Wellington and Taranaki. Larvae of this species have been reared from kānuka leaf litter. Adults are on the wing in December. This species is classified as "At Risk, Naturally Uncommon" by the Department of Conservation.

Taxonomy 
This species was described by Edward Meyrick in 1927 using a male specimen collected by George Hudson in Wellington on the hills on the eastern side of Wellington Harbour in December. Hudson discussed and illustrated the species in 1939. The holotype specimen is held at the Natural History Museum, London.

Description 

Meyrick described the species as follows:

Distribution 
This species is endemic to New Zealand. Along with its type locality, this specimen has also been collected at Egmont.

Biology and life history 

This species is on the wing in December. Larvae have been reared from trapped litter in kānuka.

Host species and habitat 
The preferred habitat of this species is open scrub.

Conservation Status 
This species has been classified as having the "At Risk, Naturally Uncommon" conservation status under the New Zealand Threat Classification System. Brian H. Patrick suggested that this species is in need of further research.

References

External links

Image of species

Moths described in 1927
Oecophorinae
Moths of New Zealand
Endemic fauna of New Zealand
Endangered biota of New Zealand
Taxa named by Edward Meyrick
Endemic moths of New Zealand